Firuzabad-e Toluy (also Romanized as Fīrūzābād-e Ţolūy; also known as Fīrūzābād and Tolūī) is a village in Golshan Rural District, in the Central District of Tabas County, South Khorasan Province, Iran. At the 2006 census, its population was 17, in 5 families.

References 

Populated places in Tabas County